The 1900–01 Butler Christians men's basketball team represented Butler University during the 1900–01 college men's basketball season. The head coach was Walter Kelly, coaching in his second season with the Christians.

Schedule

|-

References

Butler Bulldogs men's basketball seasons
Butler
Butl
Butl